The Melkite Catholic Patriarchate of Antioch is the only actual residential Patriarchate of the Melkite Greek Catholic Church (Eastern Catholic, Byzantine Rite). It was formed in 1724 when a portion of the Orthodox Church of Antioch went into communion with Rome, becoming an Eastern Catholic Church, while the rest of the ancient Patriarchate continues in full communion with the rest of the Eastern Orthodox Church.

The Melkite Greek Catholic Patriarch of Antioch's present complete title is Patriarch of Antioch and of All the East, of Alexandria and of Jerusalem of the Melkite Greek Catholic Church, incorporating both of the church's other titular patriarchates.

Its archiepiscopal see is the Cathedral of the Dormition of Our Lady (Arabic: كاتدرائية سيدة النياح للروم الملكيين في دمشق ) in Damascus, Syria. It was visited by Pope John Paul II in 2001.

The Melkite Greek Catholic Church is one of five churches that are continuations of the original See of Antioch. Thus, the Melkite Greek Catholic Church traces its existence all the way back to Saint Peter in a line of apostolic succession acknowledged by both Catholic and Orthodox canons. This claim is accepted by the Holy See and is not disputed by the other two Eastern Catholic Churches that also claim descent from the ancient See of Antioch, namely the Maronite Church and the Syriac Catholic Church, which both also have Patriarchs of Antioch.

Proper province and archdiocese 
The Patriarch also holds the office of Metropolitan of an empty Ecclesiastical province without an actual suffragan see, actually comprising only his proper Metropolitan Archeparchy of Damascus (of the Melkites)/ Damasco (Curiate Italian) / Dimašq / Aš-Šām / Damascen(us) Græcorum Melkitarum (Latin). Like the Patriarchate, in Rome it depends only upon the Congregation for the Oriental Churches.

During a vacancy in the Patriarchate (such as following the resignation of Gregory III Laham in 2017), the bishop of the permanent synod who is most senior by ordination serves as administrator in chief of the Melkite Greek Catholic Church.

As per 2014, it pastorally served 3,000 Catholics in 8 parishes and 1 mission with 9 priests (6 diocesan, 3 religious), 3 deacons, 33 lay religious (3 brothers, 30 sisters) and 10 seminarians.

Titular Patriarchates of Alexandria and of Jerusalem 
In continuation of the earlier Melkite patriarchates of those ancient sees, two titular patriarchates exist, which are however simply titles, vested in the residential Patriarch of Antioch, which also have Catholic residential counterparts: 
 Melkite Catholic Titular Patriarch of Alexandria
 Melkite Catholic Titular Patriarch of Jerusalem

List of Melkite Greek Catholic Patriarchs of Antioch, Alexandria and Jerusalem

 Cyril VI Tanas (born Syria) (1724.10.01 – death 1759.07.08)
 Athanasius IV Jawhar ([Jaouhar]) (born Syria) first term (1759.07.19 – 1760.08.01), next Eparch (Bishop) of Saida of the Greek-Melkites (Lebanon) (1761 – 1788.05.05 see below)
 Maximos II Hakim (born Syria), Basilian Chouerite Order of Saint John the Baptist (B.C.) (1760.08.01 – death 1761.11.15); previously Archeparch (Archbishop) of Aleppo of the Greek-Melkites (Syria) (1732 – 1760.08.01)
 Theodosius V Dahan (born Syria),  B.C. (1761.12.24 – death 1788.04.10), previously Metropolitan Archeparch (Archbishop) of Beirut of the Greek-Melkites (Lebanon) (1736 – 1761.12.24)
 Athanasius IV Jawhar second term (see above 1788.05.05 – death 1794.12.02)
 Cyril VII Siaj (born Syria) (1794.12.11 – death 1796.08.06), previously Metropolitan Archbishop of Bosra of the Greek-Melkites (Syria) (1763 – 1794.12.11)
 Agapius II Matar (born Syria), B.S. (1796.09.11 – 1812.02.02), previously Superior General of Basilian Order of the Most Holy Saviour (B.S., Salvatorian Fathers) (1789 – 1795), Eparch (Bishop) of Saïdā of the Greek-Melkites (Lebanon) (1795 – 1796.09.11)
 Ignatius IV Sarrouf (born Syria) (1812)
 Athanasius V Matar (born Syria) (1813)
 Macarius IV Tawil (born Syria) (1813–1815)
 Ignatius V Qattan (born Syria) (1816–1833)
 Maximos III Mazloum (born Syria) (1833–1855)
 Clement Bahouth (born Egypt) (1856–1864)
 Gregory II Youssef-Sayur (born Egypt) (1864–1897)
 Peter IV Jaraijiry (born Lebanon) (1898–1902)
 Cyril VIII Geha (born Syria) (1902–1916)
vacant (1916–1919)
 Demetrius I Qadi (born Syria) (March 29, 1919 – October 25, 1925)
 Cyril IX Moghabghab (born Lebanon) (December 8, 1925 – September 8, 1947)
 Maximos IV Sayegh (born Syria) (October 30, 1947 – November 5, 1967)
 Maximos V Hakim (born Egypt) (November 22, 1967 – November 22, 2000)
 Jean Assaad Haddad as Apostolic Administrator (June 6, 2000 – November 29, 2000)
 Gregory III Laham (born Syria) (November 29, 2000 – May 6, 2017)
 Jean-Clément Jeanbart as Administrator (May 6, 2017 – June 21, 2017)
 Youssef I Absi (born Syria) (June 21, 2017 – present)

Auxiliary Episcopate of the See of Antioch 
 Auxiliary Bishop: François Abou Mokh, B.S. (1996 – 1998.07.27)
 Auxiliary Bishop: Isidore Battikha, B.A. (66) (1992.08.25 – 2006.02.09)
 Auxiliary Bishop: Jean Mansour, M.S.P. (1980.08.19 – 1997)
 Auxiliary Bishop: François Abou Mokh, B.S. (1978.02.07 – 1992)
 Auxiliary Bishop: Élias Nijmé, B.A. (1971.08.16 – 1978.02.07)
 Auxiliary Bishop: Saba Youakim, B.S. (1968.09.09 – 1970.10.15)
 Auxiliary Bishop: Nicolas Hajj (1965.07.30 – 1984.11.03)
 Auxiliary Bishop: Néophytos Edelby, Basilian Aleppian Order (B.A.) (1961.12.24 – 1968.03.06)
 Auxiliary Bishop: Pierre Kamel Medawar, Society of Missionaries of Saint Paul (M.S.P.) (1943.03.13 – 1969)

Gallery

See also 
 List of Catholic dioceses in Syria
 Latin Patriarchate of Antioch
 List of Popes
 Council of Catholic Patriarchs of the East

References

Sources and external links 
 List of the Melkite Patriarchs of Antioch from Melkite Church official website
 GCatholic.org - Greek-Melkite Catholic Patriarchate of Antioch
 GCatholic - Patriarchal proper Metropolitan Archeparchy of Damascus
 History of Melkite Church including Cannons regarding Reunion with Rome and the legal continuation of the See of Antioch. 
 Legal circumstances of union with Rome.
 Catholic Hierarchy entry

Eastern Catholic dioceses
Eastern Catholic patriarchates
Eastern Catholic bishops by diocese
Lists of patriarchs

 
Melkite Greek Catholic Patriarchs
Catholic Church in Jerusalem